Vagenas is a surname. Notable people with the surname include:

Nasos Vagenas (born 1945), Greek poet and writer
Peter Vagenas (born 1978), American soccer player